Adam Nowicki (born 24 August 1990) is a Polish long-distance runner. In 2020, he competed in the men's race at the 2020 World Athletics Half Marathon Championships held in Gdynia, Poland.

References

External links 
 

Living people
1990 births
Place of birth missing (living people)
Polish male long-distance runners
Polish male marathon runners
Athletes (track and field) at the 2020 Summer Olympics
Olympic athletes of Poland
Olympic male marathon runners